Wartiainen is a surname. Notable people with the surname include:

 Kai Wartiainen (born 1953), Finnish architect and academic
 Yvonne Wartiainen (born 1976), Norwegian painter

Surnames of Scandinavian origin